The 2013 season was the 108th season of competitive football in Norway.

The season began in March, and ended in November with the 2013 Norwegian Football Cup Final.

Men's football

Promotion and relegation

Teams promoted to Tippeligaen
 Start
 Sarpsborg 08

Teams relegated from Tippeligaen
 Stabæk
 Fredrikstad

Teams promoted to 1. divisjon
 Elverum
 Kristiansund
 Vard Haugesund
 Follo

Teams relegated from 1. divisjon
 Tromsdalen
 Bærum
 Notodden
 Alta

Teams promoted to the 2. divisjon
 Drøbak/Frogn
 Skedsmo
 Lyn
 Eidsvold Turn
 Arendal
 Viking 2
 Arna-Bjørnar
 Førde
 Skarbøvik
 Strindheim
 Bodø/Glimt 2
 Bossekop

Teams relegated from the 2. divisjon
 Ørn-Horten
 Lillehammer
 Brumunddal

League season

Tippeligaen

1. divisjon

2. divisjon

Group 1

Group 2

Group 3

Group 4

3. divisjon

Norwegian Cup

Final

Women's football

League season

Toppserien

1. divisjon

Norwegian Women's Cup

Final
Avaldsnes 0–1 Stabæk

Men's UEFA competitions

Champions League

Qualifying phase

Second qualifying round

|}

Third qualifying round

|}

UEFA Europa League

Qualifying phase

First qualifying round

|}

Second qualifying round

|}

Third qualifying round

|}

Play-off round

|}

Group stage

Group K

UEFA Women's Champions League

Knockout phase

Round of 32

|}

National teams

Norway men's national football team

2014 FIFA World Cup qualification (UEFA)

During the season, the Norway national team played five games in the qualification for 2014 FIFA World Cup.

Group E

Friendlies

Norway women's national football team

Friendlies

2013 Algarve Cup

Group A

Third place match

2015 FIFA Women's World Cup qualification (UEFA)

Group 5

Managerial changes

References

 
Seasons in Norwegian football